U-104 may refer to one of the following German submarines:

 , a Type U 57 submarine launched in 1917 and that served in the First World War until sunk on 25 April 1918
 During the First World War, Germany also had these submarines with similar names:
 , a Type UB III submarine launched in 1917 and that disappeared in September 1918
 , a Type UC III submarine launched in 1918 and surrendered on 24 November 1918; broken up at Brest in July 1921
 , a Type IXB submarine that served in the Second World War until she went missing after 28 November 1940

Submarines of Germany

es:Piedras rúnicas sobre Grecia#U 104